Eucalyptus leucophylla, commonly known as Cloncurry box, is a species of tree or mallee that is predominantly found in northwest Queensland with small populations possibly also occurring in the eastern Kimberley region Western Australia. It has rough, finely fissured bark, lance-shaped adult leaves, flower buds in groups of seven, creamy white flowers and cup-shaped fruit.

Description
It has rough, finely fissured greyish bark on the trunk and branches. Flowering has been observed in March and August and the flowers are creamy-white.

Taxonomy and naming
Eucalyptus leucophylla was first formally described by the botanist Karel Domin in 1928 in his book Bibliotheca Botanica. The specific epithet (leucophylla) means "white-leaved".

Distribution and habitat
Cloncurry box is often found on low hills and in valleys in low woodland communities along with Corymbia terminalis or Eucalyptus leucophloia or Eucalyptus pruinosa often with an understorey of Acacia hilliana and Triodia grasses. It is mainly found in north-western Queensland near Camooweal, Mt Isa, Cloncurry and Kajabbi.

The Western Australian Herbarium site FloraBase lists this species as occurring in the Kimberley region of Western Australia but E. leucophylla is very similar to other eucalypts occurring in this area, including E. limitaris and E. xerothermica. 

E. leucophylla was previously described as Eucalyptus argillacea in Queensland.

Conservation status
This eucalypt is classified by the Queensland Government as of "least concern".

See also

List of Eucalyptus species

References

Eucalypts of Western Australia
Trees of Australia
leucophylla
Myrtales of Australia
Plants described in 1928
Flora of Queensland
Taxa named by Karel Domin